The 4th Airmobile Brigade is a helicopter unit of the French Army. It makes up most of the French Army Light Aviation. The brigade is heir to the traditions and honours of the 4th Airmobile Division. The French Army announced that the brigade would be disbanded in 2010 and its constituent units placed directly under the command of the Land Forces Command. It was later announced, by the French Armed Forces, that the brigade would be reraised on July 1, 2016 as the 4th Air Combat Brigade (4e Brigade d'Aérocombat), headquartered at Clermont-Ferrant, directly subordinated to the COMALAT (the army aviation command) and including the 1st, 3rd and 5th Combat Helicopter Regiments.

Composition 
1 Régiment d'Hélicoptères de Combat (1 RHC) Combat Helicopter Regiment in Phalsbourg with 22 Gazelle, 20 Puma and 14 Cougar
3 Régiment d'Hélicoptères de Combat (3 RHC) Combat Helicopter Regiment in Etain with 37 Gazelle, 16 Puma
5 Régiment d'Hélicoptères de Combat (5 RHC) Combat Helicopter Regiment in Pau with 52 various Gazelle and Puma helicopters
4 Compagnie de Commandement et de Transmissions (4 CCT) in Clermont-Ferrand

The 6 Régiment d'Hélicoptères de Combat (6 RHC) Combat Helicopter Regiment in Margny-lès-Compiègne was disbanded in July 2007. The airport has changed into civil status.

References

External links 
  Defence Ministry

Brigades of France
Airmobile brigades
Military units and formations disestablished in 2010
Military units and formations established in 1999
1999 establishments in France